Firmiana is a genus of flowering plant in the family Malvaceae, formerly placed in the now defunct Sterculiaceae; it may sometimes be called the "parasol tree". The genus name honours Karl Joseph von Firmian.

Species
The Catalogue of Life lists 16 species:
Firmiana calcarea
Firmiana colorata
Firmiana danxiaensis
Firmiana diversifolia
Firmiana fulgens
Firmiana hainanensis
Firmiana kerrii
Firmiana kwangsiensis
Firmiana major
Firmiana malayana
Firmiana minahassae
Firmiana papuana
Firmiana philippinensis
Firmiana pulcherrima
Firmiana simplex — Chinese parasol tree, or wutong
Firmiana sumbawaensis

Gallery

References

External links

Sterculioideae
Malvaceae genera
Taxonomy articles created by Polbot